The 2017/18 NTFL season was the 97th season of the Northern Territory Football League (NTFL).

The first game was played on Friday, 6 October 2017, and the Grand Final was played on Wednesday 21 March 2018, with the Southern Districts Crocs defeating Darwin Buffaloes in a 1-point thriller to win their 3rd premiership title.

 The Round 14 match between Nightcliff and Southern Districts was abandoned.

Ladder

Finals

Grand Final

References

Northern Territory Football League seasons
NTFL